German submarine U-82 was a Type VIIC U-boat of Nazi Germany's Kriegsmarine during World War II.

Her keel was laid down on 15 May 1940 by Bremer Vulkan-Vegesacker Werft of Bremen as yard number 10. She was launched on 15 March 1941 and commissioned on 14 May with Oberleutnant zur See Siegfried Rollmann in command.

Design
German Type VIIC submarines were preceded by the shorter Type VIIB submarines. U-82 had a displacement of  when at the surface and  while submerged. She had two shafts and two  propellers.

U-82 was fitted with five  torpedo tubes (four fitted at the bow and one at the stern), fourteen torpedoes, one  SK C/35 naval gun, 220 rounds, and a  C/30 anti-aircraft gun. The boat had a complement of between forty-four and sixty.

Service history
U-82 conducted three patrols whilst serving with the 3rd U-boat Flotilla from 14 May 1941 to 6 February 1942 when she was sunk. She was a member of four wolfpacks.

First patrol
The boat's first patrol began with her departure from Trondheim in Norway on 11 August 1941 after moving from Kiel in July. Her route took her across the Norwegian Sea and through the gap separating Iceland and the Faroe Islands toward the Atlantic Ocean.

She sank the Empire Hudson northeast of Greenland on the 10 September 1941 followed by four more ships: the Bulysees, the Gypsum Queen, the Empire Crossbill and the Scania, all on the 11th.

U-82 then docked at Lorient on the French Atlantic coast on 5 July.

Second patrol
The boat sank two more ships on her second foray but when she returned to France she went to La Pallice on 19 November 1941.

Third patrol and loss
On her final patrol, U-82 sank Athelcrown, and Leiesten in mid-Atlantic. At the end of January she attacked and sank , a US-built, south of Newfoundland. On 6 February 1942, while returning from patrol, she encountered convoy OS 18 north-east of the Azores. While attempting to attack she was sunk with all 45 of her crew by depth charges from the British sloop  and the corvette .

Summary of raiding history

References

Notes

Citations

Bibliography

 Axel Neistle : German U-Boat Losses during World War II (1998)

External links
 

German Type VIIC submarines
U-boats commissioned in 1941
U-boats sunk in 1942
U-boats sunk by British warships
U-boats sunk by depth charges
World War II submarines of Germany
World War II shipwrecks in the Atlantic Ocean
1941 ships
Ships built in Bremen (state)
Ships lost with all hands
Maritime incidents in February 1942